Kala Kamala is a village located in the district of Gujrat, in Punjab, Pakistan. Kala Kamala founded by two brothers (caste Gujjar) called Kala and Kamala.
"Kala" moved into unspecified, period in the city Kala Gujjran (appointed by the latter), near Jehlum city.
Families from Mr. Kamala descendants still live in the village, and they are the landowners.

History

The village was founded by two brothers, named Kala and Kamala, from caste Gujjar (subcaste Thikri, Also Called Thikariye Gujjar).

Economy

The village economy is based on agriculture (wheat, rice, sugar cane). 
In addition to agriculture it is based secondarily on the breeding of buffaloes and cows. 
Agriculture is supported by 4 large machining centers for wheat and rice established in the village by the local people, the first was established early 90s, from a family of Landowners, and three more were built after 2007, which allows large amount to do business of these primary products in much of the country.
Instead breeding buffaloes and cows, meets the demands of the village and some surrounding villages.
A great support comes from external revenue of emigrants across North America, Europe and in the Arab countries. Many persons from this Centre village residents are wealthy and in many European countries and North America.

Residents
The people living in the village are various: Gujjar (only high caste), followed by Qureshi, faqeer, qasbi, mochi, nai, machi and mussalli.
The Gujjar are divided into sub-castes:
Thikriye (founders of the village, and in the majority), followed by Khatana's (transferred from the village Ismaila Shareef, a long time ago), Khasana's (emigrated from the village Noonanwali), Aqle (also emigrated from Bhaugaseet a village in Kharian subdistrict) and Miane .

Services

The village is equipped with a petrol station, there are more than 4 medium-sized shops.

Location

The village is located about 5 km from the city "Dinga", and is on the road Dinga-Mangowal. It is 30 km from Gujrat which is under his district.

Saints 
There are three shrines in the village:

Baba Noor Shah, an old syed from Panjan Khassana, died in this village and the people of Kala Kamala built his tomb and shrine.

Mian Ghulam Ahmed, an elder in the family of Miane, his tomb is located in the center of the village, he was a person described as a man of God.

Baba Khan Saab, an elderly, which the tomb and shrine is next to the graveyard of the village, was a man of God.

During the time that the Hindus khatri, had begun to massacre the Muslims of the subcontinent, Baba Khan Saab asked Allah to save him from death at the hands of khatri, and there was a miracle, the earth opened, and Baba Khan Saab sink into the ground and you create on that place a Qabar.

References

Villages in Gujrat District